The Department of Local Government is a former department of the government of New Brunswick. It was created on February 14, 2006 by the Graham Government with the separation of the Departments of Environment and of Local Government. The Lord Government had combined the Departments of Environment and Municipalities and Housing in 2000 to form the Department of Environment and Local Government. 

On March 15, 2012, the Department of Environment and Department of Local Government re-merged, once again forming the Department of Environment and Local Government under the Alward government.

Ministers

References

External links
Local Government website

Local Government, Department of
2006 establishments in New Brunswick